Pennsylvania Route 5 (PA 5) is a westward continuation of New York State Route 5 (NY 5) in Pennsylvania. The highway is called the Purple Heart Highway and mostly called Lake Road. The Seaway Trail runs along PA 5 for most of its course in Pennsylvania.

Route description 

The Seaway Trail, a scenic route runs along PA 5 for its entire routing in Pennsylvania except in Erie.

PA 5 begins as Lake Road heading towards the northeast paralleling Lake Erie through western Erie County. In the village of North Springfield, PA 5 intersects the northern terminus of Pennsylvania Route 215. Then, PA 5 intersects the northern terminus of Pennsylvania Route 18, a road that crosses the entire state of Pennsylvania.

In Fairview Township, PA 5 intersects the northern terminus of Pennsylvania Route 98. In Millcreek Township, PA 5 intersects the western terminus of Pennsylvania Route 5 Alternate at a "Y" intersection with Asbury Road. PA 5 Alternate continues as Lake Road until it crosses Pennsylvania Route 832, which is labeled Peninsula Drive, at which point it proceeds as West 8th Street into the Erie city limits. At Frontier Park, PA 5 Alternate turns 90 degrees north and wends its way around the park, becoming West 6th Street after crossing over the Bayfront Parkway. PA 5 Alternate passes around Gridley Park at Liberty Street and Perry Square at State Street. Between the two parks is a stretch of prominent homes known as Millionaires Row. PA 5 Alternate proceeds east to its terminus at Franklin Avenue, which marks the city limits and the resumption of PA 5.

PA 5 passes Erie International Airport in Millcreek Township as 12th Street.

In the city of Erie, PA 5 interchanges the northern terminus of Interstate 79 at exit 183 and the western terminus of Pennsylvania Route 290. PA 290 begins concurrent with PA 5. PA 5 and PA 290 head towards the east into downtown Erie as 12th Street. As PA 5 goes through Erie, the Seaway Trail takes many turns around the city. In downtown Erie, PA 290 ends the concurrency with PA 5 when PA 290 heads towards the southeast as Bayfront Parkway. Then, PA 5 makes a 90 degree angle turn towards the north to become Franklin Avenue, then another 90 degree turn towards the east to become Lake Road and meets the eastern terminus of PA 5 Alternate; the Seaway Trail now runs along PA 5 east of here. In Lawrence Park Township, PA 5 meets the western terminus of Pennsylvania Route 955.

PA 5 continues towards the east paralleling Lake Erie which can be seen from PA 5. In North East, PA 5 meets the northern terminus of Pennsylvania Route 89. PA 5 along with Seaway Trail continue towards the northeast as Lake Road. At the New York state line, PA 5 terminates (ends) and continues along with the Seaway Trail as New York State Route 5, ending in Albany.

Major intersections

PA 5 Alternate

Pennsylvania Route 5 Alternate is a  alternate route in Erie County in Pennsylvania. In 1955, the designations of mainline and alternate Routes 5 were switched. The route begins in suburban Millcreek Township where its parent route passes near Erie International Airport. It then passes through a heavily suburbanized and residential two-lane sector, before serving as portions of 8th and 6th Streets in Erie city. Passing relatively close to the lake, it travels through several picturesque tree-lined streets of large homes, skirting the city center and industrial areas. Near its eastern end, it is four lanes and divided, with a parkway-like setting formed by the tree-lined median. Almost immediately after entering the suburb of Lawrence Park Township, the route ends at its parent.

See also

References

External links

Pennsylvania Highways: PA 5

Transportation in Erie, Pennsylvania
005
Transportation in Erie County, Pennsylvania